B'nai Israel Temple is a historic Jewish synagogue at 249 S. 400 East in Salt Lake City, Utah.

The synagogue was built in 1890 and added to the National Register of Historic Places in 1978. It replaced an older synagogue, which was located on the corner of 300 South and 200 West in downtown Salt Lake City. The building was originally planned to be a "facsimile in miniature" of Berlin's Fasanenstrasse Synagogue, as most of the congregation had originated in Germany, but plans were changed during construction. The synagogue was established in 1873.

The congregation observed an Orthodox style of worship until 1883, when it joined the Union of American Hebrew Congregations, the Reform movement. In 1885, the members who wanted B'nai Israel to continue to follow Orthodox tradition split off to form their own congregation, Congregation Montefiore (which later affiliated itself with the United Synagogue of Conservative Judaism).  In 1973, Montefiore and B'nai Israel merged to form Congregation Kol Ami, which is a member of both the Union for Reform Judaism and the United Synagogue of Conservative Judaism.

See also
Congregation Montefiore Synagogue - Synagogue belonging to the second Jewish congregation in the Salt Lake City area.
Congregation Sharey Tzedek Synagogue - Synagogue belonging to the third Jewish congregation in the Salt Lake City area.

References

German-Jewish culture in the United States
Synagogues completed in 1890
Synagogues in Salt Lake City
Synagogues on the National Register of Historic Places in Utah
National Register of Historic Places in Salt Lake City